Viggo Elith William Pio (3 July 1887 – 10 February 1983) was a Danish actor of stage, screen, radio and television. He is most noted for starring roles in films such as Carl Theodor Dreyer's Leaves from Satan's Book, Johan Jacobsen's Jenny and the Soldier and Benjamin Christensen's Häxan.

Theatre
Elith Pio made his theatre debut in 1907 as a member of the Peter Fjelstrup's theater company. He worked in various theaters in Denmark until 1931, when he was employed by the Royal Danish Theatre. He remained a member of the Royal Theatre until his retirement in 1974. Some of his most famous roles were Aristophanes in Johan Ludvig Heiberg's A Soul after the Dead, Dr. Relling and Old Ekdal in Henrik Ibsen's The Wild Duck (Vildanden) and  a chamberlain to in Ibsen's  The League of Youth (De unges forbund). In Denmark Pio was also well known for his numerous roles on local radio theatre, where his characteristic voice was an invaluable asset.

Film
Pio debuted on screen in the 1908 production of A Folk Tale (Et Folkesagn). Thereafter, he performed in approximately 40 silent films. In 1931, well known from his work at the Royal Theatre, Pio starred in his first sound feature, Hotel Paradis, in the role of Fridolin. From then on he took part in over forty films. In 1947, Pio appeared as the state's attorney in the film Jenny and the Soldier (Soldaten og Jenny) which received the first Bodil Award for Best Danish Film. Pio's last film, The Man Who Thought Life (Manden der tænkte ting) starring John Price, was nominated for the Palme d'Or at the Cannes Film Festival in 1969.

As part of a small group of participants in an emerging Danish cinema, Pio was a favorite of many directors, working more than once with Benjamin Christensen, Viggo Larsen, Mogens Skot-Hansen, Emanuel Gregers, Ole Palsbo, Gabriel Axel, Knud Leif Thomsen, Lau Lauritzen Jr. & Alice O'Fredericks, Svend Methling, and the legendary Carl Theodor Dreyer. He worked four times with director Johan Jacobsen—most notably on Jenny and the Soldier—and four times with director George Schnéevoigt, who had worked as the cinematographer for both of Elith's films with Dreyer. Elith also acted in eight films authored by Danish screenwriter Fleming Lynge, who wrote the 1952 film Meet me on Cassiopeia.

Select filmography
 Blind Justice (1916)
 Häxan - 1922
 Hotel Paradis - 1931
 Kirke og orgel - 1932
 Tango - 1933
 Kongen bød - 1938
 Et skud før midnat - 1942
 Forellen - 1942
 Tordenskjold går i land - 1942
 Vi kunne ha' det så rart - 1942
 Alt for karrieren - 1943
 Drama på slottet - 1943
 Kriminalassistent Bloch - 1943
 Når man kun er ung - 1943
 Som du vil ha' mig - 1943
 Otte akkorder - 1944
 Biskoppen - 1944
 Affæren Birte - 1945
 Mens sagføreren sover - 1945
 Ta', hvad du vil ha''' - 1947
 Soldaten og Jenny - 1947
 For frihed og ret - 1949
 Den opvakte jomfru - 1950
 Familien Schmidt - 1951
 Sønnen - 1953
 Eventyrrejsen - 1960
 Ullabella - 1961
 Løgn og løvebrøl - 1961
 Duellen - 1962
 Tine - 1964
 Dyden går amok - 1966
 Manden der tænkte ting'' - 1969

External links

Danish male film actors
Danish male stage actors
Danish male silent film actors
20th-century Danish male actors
Male actors from Copenhagen
1887 births
1983 deaths